Paul Karason (November 14, 1950 – September 23, 2013) was an American from Bellingham, Washington whose skin turned a purple-blue color over a period of about a decade.

In 2008, Karason first gained prominence after appearing on Today. His skin was described as turning blue after he took a homemade silver chloride colloid and rubbing a solution of colloidal silver on his face in an attempt to treat problems with his sinuses, dermatitis, acid reflux and other issues. He claimed it cured his acid reflux and arthritis.

Karason was fair-skinned and freckled until about 1993, when his complexion began to develop the bluish hue associated with argyria. The condition was permanent.

Karason moved from Oregon to the California Central Valley community Madera in the summer of 2007 seeking greater community acceptance. He described himself as somewhat of a recluse. By 2012, Karason lost his home while battling a heart condition and prostate cancer. He later moved to a homeless shelter in Bellingham.

In 2013, Karason died after a heart attack led to pneumonia and a severe stroke. He was a heavy smoker and underwent a triple bypass surgery in 2008. He was estranged from his wife at the time of his death. Karason continued to use colloidal silver until his death.

See also
Stan Jones, Libertarian politician known for his artificially induced blue-grey skin tone
Blue Fugates, a family from Kentucky with blue skin caused by a genetic mutation

References

1950 births
2013 deaths
People from Bellingham, Washington